Phrixosceles fibulatrix is a moth of the family Gracillariidae. It is known from Fiji

References

Gracillariinae
Moths described in 1922